Terraced Falls ht.  is a waterfall on Fall River in Yellowstone National Park.  
The highest waterfall on Fall River, Terraced Falls was probably named by the Hague Geological Survey in 1885–1886.  An attempt was made to rename it "Totem Falls" in the 1920s, but the USBGN kept the original name.  Terraced Falls is easily accessed via a short trail from the Ashton-Flagg Ranch Road along Yellowstone National Park's south border.

See also
 Waterfalls in Yellowstone National Park

Notes

Waterfalls of Yellowstone National Park
Waterfalls of Wyoming
Waterfalls of Teton County, Wyoming